Chu or CHU may refer to:

Chinese history
 Chu (state) (c. 1030 BC–223 BC), a state during the Zhou dynasty
 Western Chu (206 BC–202 BC), a state founded and ruled by Xiang Yu
 Chu Kingdom (Han dynasty) (201 BC–70 AD), a kingdom of the Han dynasty
 Chu (403–404), a state founded by Huan Xuan during the Jin dynasty
 Chu (Ten Kingdoms) (907–951), a kingdom during the Five Dynasties and Ten Kingdoms period
 Da Chu (1127), a puppet state installed by the Jurchen Jin dynasty during the Jin–Song wars

People

Surnames
 Chu (Chinese surname)
 Zhu (surname) or Chu 
 Chu (Korean name)
 Joo (Korean name) or Chu

Places
 Hubei or Chu, a province of China
 Hunan or Chu, a province of China
 Chũ, a town and district capital in Bac Giang Province, Vietnam

Rivers
 Chu River (Tributary of Wei River), a river of Ningxiang County, Hunan Province, China
 Chu River (Anhui), a river in Anhui and Jiangsu provinces, in China
 Chu (river), a river in Kyrgyzstan and Kazakhstan
 Nam Sam River or Chu River, a river in eastern Laos and the North Central Coast region of Vietnam
 Lục Nam River or Chũ River, a river in the Northeast region of Vietnam

Facilities and structures
 Houston County Airport (Minnesota)'s IATA code
 CHU (radio station), time signal, Ottawa, Canada
 Chung Hua University, Hsinchu, Taiwan
 Centre Hospitalier et Universitaire de Yaoundé (University Teaching Hospital of Yaounde), Cameroon
 CHU UCLouvain Namur, a university hospital, Namur, Belgium

Music
 "Chu" (song), a song by f(x)
 Zhu (percussion instrument) or Chu, an ancient Chinese instrument

Other uses
 Christelijk-Historische Unie or Christian-Historical Union, a former Protestant political party in the Netherlands
 Containerized housing unit, a shipping container converted to living space
 China Unicom's NYSE stock symbol CHU
 Old Church Slavonic's ISO 639 alpha-3 code
 Chu (Daoism), religious practices named chú (廚, "kitchen")
 Centigrade Heat Unit, an obsolete measure of heat

See also
 Choo (disambiguation)
 Chuu (disambiguation)
 "Mr. Chu" (A Pink song)
 Shu, Kazakhstan (disambiguation)